Microseris scapigera is a yellow-flowered daisy, a perennial herb, found in New Zealand and Australia. It is the only New Zealand species of Microseris, and one of three Australian species along with Microseris lanceolata and Microseris walteri. It is classified in a group of plants, the tribe Cichorieae, that includes chicory and dandelion.

The murnong or "yam daisy" has been referred to M. scapigera, M. lanceolata, or M. forsteri, but is now classified as M. walteri.

Now rare and vulnerable due to loss of habitat.

Taxonomy and nomenclature

Joseph Banks and Daniel Solander collected specimens of the plant in New Zealand in 1769 or 1770, but Solander's manuscripts were never published. The locality of their collection is stated by later authors as either the Bay of Islands or Queen Charlotte Sound (Totara nui). Georg Forster (1786) listed the name "Scorzonera scapigera S." in an appendix without description. Allan Cunningham gave a brief description in 1839, mentioning Solander's manuscripts and Banks' specimens plus another specimen collected by his brother Richard.

Joseph Dalton Hooker thought that the species didn't belong well in Scorzonera: he had proposed a subgenus, then placed it in Microseris, beside M. pygmæa of Chile. He gave the name as Microceris Forsteri in 1852, however Cunningham's description with the epithet scapigera takes precedence. Carl Heinrich Schultz 'Bipontinus' published the combination Microseris scapigera in 1866, listing Hooker's M. forsteri and Forster's S. scapigera as synonyms. Neither Hooker nor Schultz referenced Cunningham's description; in 2015 Sneddon designated a lectotype for Schultz' name.

Some authorities have grouped M. scapigera with the other Australian forms into single species under the name M. lancifolia, for example A census of the vascular plants of Victoria, Edition 3. (1990) and Australian Plant Census (2011). Sneddon (2015), in Flora of Australia maintained two separate species, and the Melbourne Herbarium has supported both plus a third unnamed species since the early 1990s. The third species was formally described by Neville Walsh in 2016, matching herbarium specimens were identified, and the name M. walteri was selected.

Conversely, M. scapigera has earlier been "misapplied to" M. lanceolata in the Flora of South Australia (1st and 2nd editions, 1929 and 1957) and The Student's Flora of Tasmania (1963).

Botanical naming 

For more than 30 years Murnong was named as Microseris sp. or Microseris lanceolata or Microseris scapigera. Royal Botanic Gardens Victoria botanist Neville Walsh clarified the botanical name of Microseris walteri in 2016 and defined the differences in the three species in the table below.

Gallery

Uses
Plants of Microseris scapigera sensu have no tubers, but roots that are "fleshy, only slightly fibrous, and slightly, but tolerably bitter when eaten raw". Indigenous Australians may have eaten this plant also, but historical sources describe murnong as a sweet tuber. The bitterness in Microseris scapigera roots can be removed by blanching the roots in boiling water for 5 minutes, before consumption or further cooking.

Aboriginal populations in southeastern Australia relied on tubers of the daisy yam as a staple, and actively cultivated it. It is known as ngampa in the Thura-Yura languages.

References

External links
 Herbarium specimens: WELT SP063840 collected by Banks & Solander, "prope Totaranui" NZ, 1770; Kew K000796796 G. Forster, New Zealand; Kew K000796798 R.C. Gunn, Tasmania, 1844. 
 Illustrations: Sydney Parkinson 1895 (print, engraving) .

scapigera
Endemic flora of New Zealand
Plants described in 1866
Endemic flora of Australia